The Joan Crawford filmography lists the film appearances of American actress Joan Crawford, who starred in numerous feature films throughout a lengthy career that spanned nearly five decades.

She made her film debut in Lady of the Night (1925), as a body double for film star Norma Shearer. She appeared in several other films, before she made her major breakthrough playing Lon Chaney's love interest in the 1927 horror film The Unknown. Her major success in Our Dancing Daughters (1928) made her a popular flapper of the late 1920s. Her first sound film, Untamed (1929), was a critical and box office success.

Crawford would become a highly popular actress throughout the 1930s, as a leading lady for Metro-Goldwyn-Mayer. She starred in a series of "rags-to-riches" films that were extremely popular during the Depression-era, most especially with women. Her popularity rivaled fellow MGM actresses, including Greta Garbo, Norma Shearer, and Jean Harlow. She appeared in eight movies with Clark Gable, including romantic drama Possessed (1931), musical film Dancing Lady (1933), romantic comedy Love on the Run (1936), and romantic drama Strange Cargo (1940), among others. In 1937, she was proclaimed the first "Queen of the Movies" by Life magazine, but her popularity soon waned. After her films The Bride Wore Red (1937) and Mannequin (1938) proved to be expensive failures, in May 1938, Crawford – along with Greta Garbo, Katharine Hepburn, Fred Astaire, Kay Francis, and many others – was labeled "box office poison"; an actor whose "box office draw is nil".

Crawford managed to make a comeback in the comedy The Women (1939), opposite an all-star female-only cast. On July 1, 1943, Crawford was released from Louis B. Mayer, due to creative differences, and signed an exclusive contract with Warner Brothers, where she became a rival of Bette Davis. After a slow start with the studio, she received critical and commercial acclaim for her performance in the drama Mildred Pierce (1945). The film earned her an Academy Award for Best Actress. From 1946 to 1952, Crawford appeared in a series of critical and box office successes, including the musical drama Humoresque (1946), film noirs Possessed (1947, for which she received a second Academy Award nomination) and Flamingo Road (1949), drama The Damned Don't Cry (1950), and romantic comedy Goodbye, My Fancy (1951), among others. She received a third – and final – Academy Award nomination for her performance in the thriller Sudden Fear (1952).

In 1953, Crawford starred in the musical Torch Song, her final film role for MGM. Her next film, Johnny Guitar (1954), although not originally a hit, has become considered a classic. During the latter half of the 1950s, Crawford starred in a series of B-movies, including romantic dramas Female on the Beach (1955) and Autumn Leaves (1956). In 1962, Crawford was teamed with Bette Davis, in a film adaptation of What Ever Happened to Baby Jane? (1962). The thriller film was a box office hit, and briefly revived Crawford's career. Her final film performance was in the British science fiction film, Trog (1970).

Filmography

Feature films

‡ denotes lost film

Short subjects

Archival footage

Uncompleted films

Television

Awards and nominations

Box Office Ranking

See also: Top Ten Money Making Stars Poll

1929 - 15
1930 - 1
1931 - 3
1932 - 3
1933 - 10
1934 - 6
1935 - 5
1936 - 7
1937 - 16
1947 - 21

References

 Vincent Terrace, Experimental Television, Test Films, Pilots and Trial Series, 1925-1995. 
 Lee Goldberg, Unsold Television Pilots, 1955-1988. 
 Joan Crawford Papers, Billy Rose Collection, Lincoln Center Library for the Performing Arts. http://www.nypl.org/archives/4282
 Bob Thomas, Joan Crawford. 
 Alexander Walker, Joan Crawford: The Ultimate Star. 
 Lawrence J. Quirk, The Films of Joan Crawford. Citadel Pr; 1st Carol Pub.

External links

 
 
 

Actress filmographies
Filmography
American filmographies